Reginald Johnson (15 April 1904–1984) was an English footballer who played in the Football League for Fulham and Swindon Town.

References

1904 births
1984 deaths
English footballers
Association football midfielders
English Football League players
Stourport Swifts F.C. players
Cradley Heath F.C. players
Fulham F.C. players
Swindon Town F.C. players